Klaus-Peter Nabein (10 May 1960 – 12 October 2009) was a German middle- and long-distance runner. He won medals at the 1982 and 1987 European Indoor Championships. In addition, he competed at the 1989 World Indoor Championships. Later in his career he competed primarily in road races.

International competitions

Personal bests
Outdoor
800 metres – 1:46.03 (Lausanne 1982)
1000 metres – 2:20.12 (Ingelheim 1982)
1500 metres – 3:35.98 (Hengelo 1986)
One mile – 3:54.11 (Lausanne 1986)
3000 metres – 7:53.51 (Birmingham 1989)
5000 metres – 13:42.80 (Koblenz 1989)
Half marathon – 1:03:38 (Brussels 1995)
Marathon – 2:14:16 (Hannover 1996)
Indoor
800 metres – 1:48.31 (Milan 1982)
1500 metres – 3:42.59 (Stuttgart 1989)
3000 metres – 7:53.15 (Budapest 1989)

References

All-Athletics profile

1960 births
2009 deaths
People from Aschaffenburg (district)
Sportspeople from Lower Franconia
Polish male middle-distance runners
Polish male steeplechase runners
Polish male long-distance runners
Athletes (track and field) at the 1980 Summer Olympics
Olympic athletes of Poland
World Athletics Championships athletes for Poland
20th-century German people